Marina Stakusic (born 27 November 2004) is a Canadian tennis player. Who is the sister to Canadian tennis player Marko Stakusic.

Stakusic has a career-high WTA singles ranking of  361 and a career-high doubles ranking of 510. She also achieved a combined junior ranking of 31.

She made her WTA Tour main-draw debut at the 2022 Championnats Banque Nationale de Granby.

ITF finals

Doubles: 2 (1 title, 1 runner-up)

References

External links
 
 

2004 births
Living people
Canadian female tennis players
Racket sportspeople from Ontario
Sportspeople from Mississauga
Canadian people of Serbian descent